Cornelis (Cor) Dam (April 26, 1935 – July 29, 2019) was a Dutch artist, who has been active as sculptor, painter, illustrator and ceramist.

Life and work 
Born in Delft, Dam studied at the Royal Academy of Art in The Hague. After graduating he worked as a designer at the De Koninklijke Porceleyne Fles from 1950 to 1965. And from 1956 until 1980 he worked at Ateliers Ceramic Structure 68 bv in The Hague. Since 1988 he lectured at the Technical University of Delft.

Cor passed away on July 29, 2019.

Sculptural works of Dam can be found in the public space of several Dutch cities. For the Anne Frankschool in the district Oosterwei in Gouda he designed a relief (see first image), showing in bright colors Anne Frank depicted, writing, candlelight in the attic, in her diary.

Works, a selection 
 Mosaic untitled (1965), Anne Frankschool in Gouda
 Woman with child (1965), Jan van Goyenstraat in Rozenburg
 Ceramic work (1967), Jozef Israelslaan in Woerden
 Women (1968), shoppingcentre Keizerslanden in Deventer
 Ceramics Shalom (1969) for the Shalomschool in Delft. Since 1984 in the Adelbert church in Delft. [4]
 Brick Mosaic (1970) [5], Ellemare in Rotterdam
 Ceramic object (1983), Industriestraat in Delft
 Four objects (1983), Nieuwe Plantage in Delft
 Untitled - multiple objects (1988), Bergselaan in Rotterdam
 Untitled (1988), Huniadijk in Rotterdam
 Untitled (1988), Cymbelkruid in Rotterdam
 Irascible birds (1996/98), Julianalaan in Schagen

Gallery

See also 
 List of Dutch ceramists
 List of Dutch sculptors

References

External links 

  Cor Dam, Beeldend Kunstenaar

1935 births
Living people
Dutch ceramists
Dutch sculptors
Dutch male sculptors
Royal Academy of Art, The Hague alumni
Academic staff of the Delft University of Technology
Artists from Delft